DAB, dab, dabs, or dabbing may refer to:

Dictionaries
 Dictionary of American Biography, published under the auspices of the American Council of Learned Societies
 Dictionary of Australian Biography, published since 1949

Places
 Dąb, Katowice, a district in southern Poland
 Dąb, Greater Poland Voivodeship, a village in west-central Poland
 Dąb, Lubusz Voivodeship, a village in west Poland
 Dąb, Warmian-Masurian Voivodeship, a village in northern Poland
 Dab, Chakwal, a village in Punjab, Pakistan

Organizations
 Da Afghanistan Bank, central bank of Afghanistan
, a Danish non-profit housing association
 Defense Acquisition Board, a United States Department of Defense purchasing oversight board
 Democratic Alliance for the Betterment and Progress of Hong Kong, a political party in Hong Kong
 Dortmunder Actien Brauerei, a German brewery

Defunct organisations 

Dabs.com, a defunct British e-commerce retailer
 Danish Automobile Building, a former Danish bus manufacturer
 Deutsch-Asiatische Bank, a former foreign bank in China

Science and technology
 Common dab, a fish
 3,3'-Diaminobenzidine or diaminobenzidine, commonly used in immunohistochemical staining
 1,4-Diaminobutane
 Digital Audio Broadcasting, or DAB, a digital radio transmission standard
 4-Dimethylaminoazobenzene (methyl yellow), a pH indicator
 Dabbing, a method of making metal casts from a wooden block, related to stereotyping

Other uses
 Dab (dance), a dance move
 Daytona Beach International Airport's IATA airport code
 Common dab, a flatfish found in European coastal waters
 Directional asking bid, a contract bridge term
 Smoking or vaporizing hash oil
 Touching a foot to the ground in motorcycle trials

See also
 D&B (disambiguation)
 Dąb (disambiguation)
 Dąb coat of arms, a Polish coat of arms
 Disambiguation